Charles Clifford Hunt was a New Zealand rugby league player who represented New Zealand.

Playing career
Hunt played for Taranaki and in 1935 was selected to represent New Zealand against Australia. He played in the second and third Test matches in the series, scoring two tries.

In 2008 he was named in the Taranaki Rugby League Team of the Century.

References

New Zealand rugby league players
New Zealand national rugby league team players
Taranaki rugby league team players
Rugby league fullbacks
Rugby league centres